Micranthes integrifolia is a species of flowering plant known by the common name wholeleaf saxifrage. It is native to western North America from British Columbia to Montana and northern California, where it grows in moist habitat, including meadows, prairies, and grassy mountain slopes. It is a perennial herb growing from a caudex and system of rhizomes, and producing a basal rosette of leaves. Each leaf is up to 7 centimeters long with a toothed or smooth-edged blade borne on a short petiole. The inflorescence arises on a stout, hairy peduncle up to 35 centimeters tall. White-petaled flowers occur in a cluster or dense array at the top.

External links
Jepson Manual Treatment
Washington Burke Museum
Photo gallery

integrifolia
Flora of the Northwestern United States
Flora of California
Flora of the Cascade Range
Flora of the Klamath Mountains
Natural history of the California Coast Ranges
Flora without expected TNC conservation status